Adesmata is a suborder of centipedes within the order Geophilomorpha containing the superfamilies Geophiloidea and Himantarioidea. This suborder contains 13 families. All members of this suborder have ventral defensive glands.

Description
Species of the suborder Adesmata are characterized by a labrum without a separate intermediate tooth, the lateral parts fringed by projections; coxal projections and telopodites of the first maxillae possessing subapical spine-sensilla and apical scutefilaments; telopodites of the second maxillae short compared to the coxosternite width; forcipular coxosternite with chitin-lines; glands along the trunk opening in ventral pore-fields; and a variable number of legs between conspecific specimens. However, there are reversals within the suborder and most autapomorphies evolved in parallel to other centipedes.

References 

Geophilomorpha
Arthropod suborders
Centipedes